Aptenopedes aptera, the wingless Florida grasshopper, is a species of spur-throated grasshopper in the family Acrididae. It is found in North America.

Subspecies
These five subspecies belong to the species Aptenopedes aptera:
 Aptenopedes aptera aptera Scudder, 1878 i
 Aptenopedes aptera borealis Hebard, 1936 i
 Aptenopedes aptera coquinae Hebard, 1936 i
 Aptenopedes aptera saturiba Hebard, 1936 i
 Aptenopedes aptera simplex Hebard, 1936 i
Data sources: i = ITIS, c = Catalogue of Life, g = GBIF, b = Bugguide.net

References

Further reading

 
 
 
 

Melanoplinae
Articles created by Qbugbot
Insects described in 1878